Japan is divided into eight regions. They are not official administrative units, though they have been used by government officials for statistical and other purposes since 1905. They are widely used in, for example, maps, geography textbooks, and weather reports, and many businesses and institutions use their home regions in their names, for example Kinki Nippon Railway, Chūgoku Bank, and Tōhoku University.

Each region contains one or more of the country's 47 prefectures. Of the four main islands of Japan,  Hokkaidō, Shikoku, and Kyūshū make up one region each, the latter also containing the Satsunan Islands, while the largest island Honshū is divided into five regions. Okinawa Prefecture is usually included in Kyūshū, but is sometimes treated as its own ninth region.

Japan has eight High Courts, but their jurisdictions do not correspond to the eight regions (see Judicial system of Japan for details).

Table

Regions and islands 
This is a list of Japan's major islands, traditional regions, and subregions, going from northeast to southwest. The eight traditional regions are marked in bold.

 Hokkaidō (the island and its archipelago)
 Honshū
 Tōhoku region (northern part)
 Kantō region (eastern part)
 Nanpō Islands (part of Tokyo Metropolis)
 Chūbu region (central part)
 Hokuriku region (northwestern Chūbu)
 Kōshin'etsu region (northeastern Chūbu)
 Tōkai region (southern Chūbu)
 Kansai (or Kinki) region (south-central part)
 Chūgoku region (western part)
 San'in region (northern Chūgoku)
 San'yō region (southern Chūgoku)
 Shikoku
 Kyūshū
 Northern Kyūshū
 Southern Kyūshū
 Ryukyu Islands
 Satsunan Islands
 Okinawa

Other regional divisions 
In many contexts in Japan (government, media markets, sports, regional business or trade union confederations), regions are used that deviate from the above-mentioned common geographical 8-region division that is sometimes referred to as "the" regions of Japan in the English Wikipedia and some other English-language publications. Examples of regional divisions of Japan as used by various institutions are:

See also
Ecoregions of Japan
Geography of Japan
Prefectures of Japan

References

External links

 
Regions of
Regions